Kentra is a hamlet overlooking the east coast of Kentra Bay, on the north east end of the Ardnamurchan peninsula near Acharacle, Scottish Highlands. It is in the Scottish council area of Highland.

The small hamlet of Ardtoe is located 1 mile northwest along the B8044 road and is accessible from the A861 road from the east at Acharacle.

References

See also
Claish Moss

Populated places in Lochaber
Sites of Special Scientific Interest in Scotland
Special Areas of Conservation in Scotland
Ardnamurchan